Ulrich Junghanns (born 25 May 1956 in Gera, Thuringia) is a German politician. From 2002 to 2008, he was Minister of Economy in the German state of Brandenburg and deputy Minister-President from 2007 till 2008.

Junghanns went to a Polytechnic Secondary School and later became an apprentice at the national stud farm at Moritzburg. In 1986, he graduated from a correspondence course of State sciences. In 1974, he joined the Democratic Farmers' Party of Germany (DBD), a satellite party of the ruling Socialist Unity Party of Germany (SED). In 1990, Junghanns was elected as the deputy chairman of the DBD and shortly after that became the acting chairman of the party. In September 1990, the DBD fused with the CDU and until 1992 Junghanns was member of the board of the German Christian Democratic Union.

In 1990, he was elected to the board of the CDU organisation in Brandenburg and as chairman of the CDU faction in the Landtag. From 1990 to 1998, Junghanns was a member of the Bundestag and chairman of the Brandenburg delegacy in the CDU faction. In 2007, he followed Jörg Schönbohm as chairman of the Brandenburg CDU, but resign from this post after the electoral defeat of the CDU in the 2008 Local Elections in Brandenburg.

Decorations
Order of Merit of the German Democratic Republic

References

1956 births
Living people
People from Gera
Democratic Farmers' Party of Germany politicians
Ministers of the Brandenburg State Government
Members of the Bundestag for Brandenburg
Members of the Bundestag 1994–1998
Christian Democratic Union of Germany politicians
Recipients of the Medal of Merit of the GDR